Harris Franklin Rall (1870–1964), Ph.D. was the first president of Iliff School of Theology in Denver, Colorado after it reopened in 1910 till 1915, and he also served as the Henry White Warren professor of Practical Theology. Rall later became president of Garrett Biblical Institute in Evanston, Illinois, and taught theology there.  Rall was active in the social gospel movement, seeking to relate Christianity to the ills of society.  Garrett named its lecture series after him.

Rall authored 24 books in the fields of theology and biblical studies including Teachings of Jesus, New Testament History, Christianity, an Inquiry into Its Nature and Truth, and A Working Faith. His work on the teachings of Jesus reflected the values of early liberalism.

Rall died in 1964 at the age of 94.

References

External links
 

1870 births
1964 deaths
American theologians